Diplomatic service is the body of diplomats and foreign policy officers maintained by the government of a country to communicate with the governments of other countries. Diplomatic personnel obtains diplomatic immunity when they are accredited to other countries. Diplomatic services are often part of the larger civil service and sometimes a constituent part of the foreign ministry.

Some intergovernmental organizations, such as the European Union, and some international non-state organizations, such as the Sovereign Military Order of Malta, may also retain diplomatic services in other jurisdictions. For non-state organizations, the reciprocation of diplomatic recognition by other jurisdictions is difficult, as diplomacy tends to establish the concept of recognition upon an assumed sovereignty over geographical territory; the SMOM, in this case, receives diplomats at its headquarters in Rome, as all permanent missions to the SMOM are jointly accredited as permanent missions to the Holy See. In relation, many more non-state international organizations, such as the IFRC/ICRC, maintain permanent non-voting observer status to intergovernmental bodies such as the United Nations General Assembly, appointing individual representatives to the observer office.

List of diplomatic services
 
 European External Action Service (European Union)
 Indian Foreign Service
 Foreign Service of Pakistan
 Sri Lanka Overseas Service
 His Majesty's Diplomatic Service (United Kingdom)
 United States Foreign Service
 Latvian diplomatic service
 Estonian diplomatic service
 Vatican Diplomatic Corps

See also
 Dual accreditation

Further reading
 
 Rana K.,(2004) "The 21st Century Ambassador: Plenipotentiary to Chief Executive" 
 Rana K.,(2002) "Bilateral Diplomacy", DiploProjects, Mediterranean Academy of Diplomatic Studies, Malta 

Diplomacy
Diplomatic services